The Men's K-1 200 metres event at the 2015 Southeast Asian Games took place on 9 June 2015 at Marina Channel.

Seven competitors representing seven countries took part in this event. It was won by Mervyn Toh Yingjie of Singapore.

Schedule
All times are Singapore Standard Time (UTC+08:00)

Start list

Results

Final

References

External links
SEA Games 2015 - Canoeing Sport Schedule

Canoeing at the 2015 Southeast Asian Games